The 1965 Clemson Tigers football team was an American football team that represented Clemson University in the Atlantic Coast Conference (ACC) during the 1965 NCAA University Division football season. In its 26th season under head coach Frank Howard, the team compiled a 5–5 record (5–2 against conference opponents), tied for the ACC championship, and was outscored by a total of 137 to 117. The team played its home games at Memorial Stadium in Clemson, South Carolina.

Bill Hecht and Floyd Rogers were the team captains. The team's statistical leaders included Thomas Ray with 1,019 passing yards, Hugh Mauldin with 664 rushing yards and 24 points scored (4 touchdowns), and Phil Rogers with 466 receiving yards.

Four Clemson players were selected by the Associated Press (AP) or the United Press International (UPI) as first-team players on the 1965 All-Atlantic Coast Conference football team: back Hugh Mauldin (AP-1, UPI-1); offensive tackle Johnny Boyette (AP-1, UPI-1); defensive end Butch Sursavage (AP-1, UPI-1); and linebacker Bill Hecht (AP-1, UPI-1).

Schedule

 South Carolina was forced by the ACC to forfeit all conference games due to ineligible players.  Clemson and NC State, who had both lost to South Carolina, were declared co-champions.

References

Clemson
Clemson Tigers football seasons
Atlantic Coast Conference football champion seasons
Clemson Tigers football